Street Acquaintances may refer to:
 Street Acquaintances (1948 film), a German drama film
 Street Acquaintances (1929 film), a Czech-German silent film